Carabus pedemontanus vesubianus is a subspecies of black-coloured beetle from family Carabidae, that can be found in  France and Italy.

References

pedemontanus vesubianus
Beetles described in 2002